The Nevada Interscholastic Activities Association (NIAA) is the governing body of athletic programs for high schools in the state of Nevada. In addition, five schools in the state of California (Coleville, Needles, North Tahoe, South Tahoe, and Truckee) and one from Arizona (Beaver Dam) are also members as the schools are geographically isolated from other in-state schools.

It is a non-profit organization founded in 1922 as the Nevada Interscholastic League and became affiliated with the National Federation of State High School Associations in 1939.  The league changed its name to the current form in 1967. The NIAA governs eligibility of student athletes, resolves disputes, organizes levels of competition by divisional separation of schools according to attendance population, and conducts state championship competitions in all the NIAA-sanctioned sports.

NIAA sanctioned sports 
The NIAA sponsors 24 sports, 13 for boys and 11 for girls.  The seasons are broken down into three seasons (Fall, Winter, and Spring).  One sport, girls' soccer, awards two championships per year as the girls' soccer season in Northern Nevada is during the Fall sports season, while the girls' soccer season in the Clark County School District in Southern Nevada is during the Winter sports season.  The 24 sports are:

Boys

Fall 
Cross Country
Football 5
Soccer
Tennis

Winter 
Basketball
Bowling 1
Skiing 2
Wrestling 5

Spring 
Baseball
Golf
Swimming and Diving
Track and Field
Volleyball1

Girls

Fall 
Cross Country
Golf
Soccer 3
Tennis
Volleyball

Winter 
Basketball
Bowling 1
Skiing 2
Soccer 4

Spring 
Softball
Swimming and Diving
Track and Field

1-Only schools in Southern Nevada compete in this sport.
2-Only schools in Northern Nevada compete in this sport.
3-Only schools in Northern Nevada compete in girls soccer in the Fall season.
4-Only schools in Southern Nevada compete in girls soccer in the Winter season.
5-Girls may participate in the boys only sanctioned sports (football and wrestling), as there is no corresponding sport for them. However, they will play against males athletes if they do so.

State Champions by Sport 
This list includes the state champions for the 10 most recent seasons for Division I (AAAA/4A) schools.

Fall

Cross Country

Football 
AAAA State Championship Results

Golf (Girls)

Soccer

Tennis 
Boys

Girls

Volleyball (Girls)

Winter

Basketball

Bowling

Soccer (Girls-S. Nevada)

Skiing

Wrestling

Spring

Baseball

Golf (Boys)

Softball

Swimming and Diving

Track and Field 
The 2011 NIAA State Track and Field Meet was held from May 20 to May 21 at Del Sol High School in Las Vegas, NV.

Volleyball (Boys, Spring 2009)

NIAA Award of Excellence 
The NIAA Award of Excellence, which began in 2001, is an award program that awards NIAA-affiliated schools points based on their varsity teams' performances in academics, athletics, and through the Citizens Through Sports program.  Each of the three major categories in high school activities – academics, athletics and sportsmanship – are weighted equally, and boys and girls programs are combined in the standings table.  Spirit points are added after the conclusion of the winter season and points are deducted for ejections and other unsportsmanlike conduct. The NIAA honors the winning school in each classification by presenting it with a championship banner and commemorative trophy. The NIAA considers the Award of Excellence in Academics, Athletics and Citizenship to be its top overall program.

The past champions include:

See also 
Sunrise 4A Region
Sunset 4A Region
Northern Nevada 4A Region
Northern Nevada 3A Region

References

External links 
NIAA official site

High school sports associations in the United States
High school sports in Nevada
Sports organizations established in 1922
1922 establishments in the United States